India's National Policy on Electronics is formulated by the government of India to boost its electronics systems and design manufacturing industry and improve its global market share. The policy was drafted in 2011 by the Department of Information Technology of the Ministry of Communication and Information Technology. It is the first of three policies for IT, telecom and electronics released by the government.

Background

The electronics industry, at about $1.75 trillion is one of the largest and fastest growing in the world. The Indian market in 2008-09 was $45 billion and is expected to reach $400 billion by 2025 .

Strategies 

The strategies in the policy include:
Provide incentives through Modified Special Incentive Package Scheme (M-SIPS)
Set up semiconductor wafer fabrication facilities
Preferential market access to domestically manufactured electronic products
Provide incentives for setting up 200 electronic manufacturing clusters (EMCs) including greenfield EMCs and upgrades of brownfield EMCs 
Establish a stable tax regime and market India as a destination to attract investments
Create a completely secure cyber ecosystem in the country
Implementation of E-waste (Management and Handling) Rules, 2011
Define National Electronic Mission
The share of Indian electronics manufacturing in the world as of 2017-18 is 26.7%. With the policy, the government is aiming to increase it to 32%.

References

External links

India's Electronics Sector: Policies, Practices & Lessons from China, R. Swaminathan, ORF

Policies of India
Electronics industry in India